was a chain of company-operated and franchised convenience stores in Japan. The company is a division of UNY Co., Ltd., which licensed the Circle K name from Alimentation Couche-Tard, a Canadian convenience store company that owns the Circle K brand.

The typical Japanese convenience store goods such as magazines, manga, soft drinks, contraceptives, onigiri, and bento are available.

As of September 1, 2016, all Circle K Sunkus stores have been rebranded as FamilyMart stores as a result of the FamilyMart Co. and Uny Group Holdings Co. merger.

History
The first Circle K store in Japan opened on March 15, 1980 in Tenpaku-ku, Nagoya.

The first Sunkus store opened in Aoba-ku, Sendai on July 23, 1980. The Sunkus chain expanded to Tokyo in 1981, Hokkaido in 1982, Osaka in 1989 and Nagoya in 1992.

Sunkus and Circle K Japan formed an equity and business alliance in October 1998.

The franchiser, Sunkus & Associates Inc. officially merged with Circle K Japan Co., Ltd. as of the September 1, 2004 fiscal year and was known officially as Circle K Sunkus Co., Ltd (株式会社サークルKサンクス). The two brands remained separate — convenience stores owned by the company have either a Sunkus sign or a Circle K sign.

Facts about Sunkus
The word "Sunkus" is a combination of the words "Sun" and the word "Thanks",  The logo is a combination of the words "Sun", "Kids", and "Us".

References

External links
 
 

Alimentation Couche-Tard
1980 establishments in Japan
2016 disestablishments in Japan
Retail companies established in 1980
Retail companies established in 2004
Retail companies disestablished in 2016
2004 mergers and acquisitions
2016 mergers and acquisitions
Retail companies based in Tokyo
Convenience stores of Japan